The Svinøy Bridge is a cantilever road bridge in the town of Svolvær in Vågan Municipality in Nordland county, Norway. The bridge connects the small island of Svinøya with the "main island" of Austvågøya in the middle of the town of Svolvær.

The bridge was opened in 1964.

See also
 List of bridges in Norway
 List of bridges

References

Vågan
Road bridges in Nordland
Bridges completed in 1964
1964 establishments in Norway